Ho-jin is a Korean masculine given name.  The meaning differs based on the hanja used to write each syllable of the name. There are 49 hanja with the reading "ho" and 43 hanja with the reading "jin" on the South Korean government's official list of hanja which may be used in given names.

People with this name include:
Chun Ho-jin (born 1960), South Korean actor
Kim Ho-jin (born 1970), South Korean actor
Park Ho-jin (born 1976), South Korean football player
Ju Ho-jin (born 1981), South Korean football player
Lee Ho-jin (born 1983), South Korean football player
Seo Ho-jin (born 1983), South Korean short track speed skater
Jung Ho-jin (born 1984), South Korean football player

See also
List of Korean given names

References

Korean masculine given names